The 1999 Mid-Eastern Athletic Conference men's basketball tournament took place March 1–6, 1999, at the Greensboro Coliseum in Greensboro, North Carolina.  defeated , 64–61 in the championship game, to win its fourth MEAC Tournament title. The Rattlers earned an automatic bid to the 1999 NCAA tournament as No. 16 seed in the East region. In the round of 64, Florida A&M fell to No. 1 overall seed Duke, 99–58.

Format
Ten of the eleven conference members participated, with the top 6 teams receiving a bye to the quarterfinal round. After seeds 8 through 11 completed games in the first round, teams were re-seeded. The lowest remaining seed was slotted against the top seed, next lowest remaining faced the #2 seed, and third lowest remaining seed squared off against the #3 seed. Norfolk State did not participate.

Bracket

References

MEAC men's basketball tournament
1998–99 Mid-Eastern Athletic Conference men's basketball season
MEAC men's basketball tournament
College basketball tournaments in North Carolina
Basketball competitions in Greensboro, North Carolina